Genesis LPMud, a multi-player computer game, is the original LPMud founded in April 1989 by Lars Pensjö, now running on CD gamedriver and mudlib, and previously hosted by Chalmers Computer Society, though hosting has since been moved to a dedicated, private server.  Medieval fantasy is the general theme.  Roleplaying is expected.

History

Genesis was created as the first implementation of the LPC language, in which the developer (commonly known as a wizard within the MUD) is able to create objects by using a language similar to the C programming language. Sparkle was the first area to be created in 1991. As new developers joined the MUD, they decided to adopt a ranking between developers themselves, in order to keep a specific balance between the new objects and areas. The game was divided in areas or domains, each in charge of a liege or main developer. The Liege determines the guidelines when working in the domain, point out what must, should and not be done, and approve developer's requests to join to the domain.

The source code is available free of charge for non commercial purposes.  This includes the CD gamedriver and mudlib, the basic configuration and a standard area.  The Genesis source code was used to create TubMUD (the first free German MUD), among others.

World
According to an ancient legend, Genesis is a giant "donut", stolen in the morning of the Universe from the kitchen of the Creator by her little errand boy, Fatty (Carl Hallén). For his crime, she cursed him to walk the surface of the donut for eternity, forever trying in vain to satiate his insatiable hunger. The donut is illuminated by the bottle of Starbrite (useful to polish the stars and other celestial bodies) suspended in the middle of the ring.

Domains
The world of Genesis is divided into twelve domains, each one following a single theme. While some are based on literary works, others are original inventions. Every domain may have a different timeline, adjusting events based on the domain's current time.

The fictional world of Dragonlance is represented by the domain of Krynn (resulting of the merge between the Krynn and Ansalon domains), based on the continent of Ansalon. Several areas or cities from the novels appear in the domain, including Palanthas, Kendermore, Solace and Xak Tsaroth.  The timeline includes the War of the Lance, based on the Chronicles, the initial trilogy written by Margaret Weis and Tracy Hickman in 1984.

The Time of Troubles in the Faerûn realm, described in the Forgotten Realms series by Ed Greenwood, is included a small domain in the MUD. J. R. R. Tolkien's The Lord of the Rings is represented through the domains of Gondor and Shire, based on Middle-earth. Both domains include several cities, including Edoras, Minas Tirith, Minas Morgul and Pelargir. The Tolkien-based domains cover the War of the Ring timeline.  Finally, Genesis includes a domain based on Earthsea, the fictional realm created by Ursula K. Le Guin for her A Wizard of Earthsea novel.  Included are the city of Gont, the town of Thwil in the island of Roke and the village of Ten Alders.  The City of Tyr is loosely based on the Dark Sun setting.

Original areas include Terel, Avenir, created in the summer of 1993 to expand the Terel domain, borrowing from different sources about religion, philosophy and mythology, between other sources, Calia, Emerald, which includes the city of Telberin under the rule of elves, and the Blackwall Mountain, where orcs, trolls, goblins and ogres can be found, Khalakhor, based on the Celtic culture from Scotland and Ireland, Raumdor, which includes the cities of Tyr and Kalad, one of the largest in the MUD, and Sparkle, the first domain created for the MUD.

The domains include more than 25,000 rooms (distinct locations).  Travelling between them is done by either "walking" (the character moving one room at the time), ships (the character pays a fee, boards a ship, and travels from a domain to another), or by alternative, rarer means (portals, tunnels, magic, etc.).

Guilds and clubs
Players are able to join various guilds and clubs, providing roleplaying opportunities and many other benefits. Every guild has a different set of restrictions, commonly race and alignment. Some guilds have a leader, a player who determines the rules for the guild, and usually decide who can and who cannot join, determine member punishments, deal with other guild leaders, and when necessary, declare war on them.

As a member, the character suffers the discount of a determined amount of combat and general experience as long as he is member of the guild. The experience in this way taken, known as "tax", is used to increase the character status within the guild. The more guilds the character belongs to, the less amount of experience the character itself obtains.

Guilds can be classified as racial, occupational, layman or craftsman. Each guild must belong, but not limited, to a branch. Racial guilds are exclusive for a single race, and usually gives players a common background with other members of the same race. Occupational guilds decide the career of the player's character. Layman guilds add an amateur profession. Craftsman guilds give the character a hobby.

Some guilds belong to more than one type, in example, they are both occupational and layman at the same time. A character belonging to this guild is not able to join another occupational or layman guild. Another kind of guilds can be considered several types at the same time, in example, they can be either occupational or layman. A character belonging to this guild is able to join another occupational guild (the previous guild is considered layman) or another layman guild (the previous guild is considered occupational). This allows a greater freedom when selecting guilds.

As with domains, some guilds are based on literature works, while others are original. As of 2006, there are 49 different guilds, including sixteen racial guilds, fifteen occupational, fifteen layman and three craftsman guilds.

Race guilds
Some race guilds are based in existing fictional works. From Tolkien's The Lord of the Rings series, the "Noldor of Imladris", the "Orcs of Middle-earth" and the "Dúnedain Houses", where twelve houses are available for players to join, including Amandil, Hador, Húrin, etc.  Dragonlance racial guilds include the "Krynn Race Guild", which allows the character to adopt a surname based in Dragonlance books, and the "Inventors" of Mount Nevermind. Some guilds are loosely based in those works, including the "Kenders of Krynn", "Minotaurs of Krynn", the "Rockfriends of Blue Mountains" and the "Adventuresome Hobbits", while others are completely original, including the "Travellers' Guild", the "Holy Order of Thanar", "Eil-Galaith Houses", "Wildrunner and Deathstalker Legions", "Grunts Guild", "The Tribe of the Red Fang", and "Amazons of the Silent Forest".

Occupational guilds
These guilds define the general environment for the character. By belonging to a determined occupational guild, characters will fight determined enemies, will defend some lands and attack others. As with racial guilds, some are based in existing fantasy works, like Dragonlance ("Knights of Solamnia", "Dragonarmies of Ansalon", "Dwarven Warriors of the Neidar Clan", "Priests of Takhisis"), The Lord of the Rings ("Rangers of Arnor", "Rangers of Ithilien", "Society of Morgul Mages", "Army of Angmar"), others are based on those fictional works but not found in them (like the "Ansalon Elvish Archers", "Secret Society of Uncle Trapspringer" and the "Thornlin Militia"), and original ones ("Union of the Warriors of the Shadow", "Ancient Order of the Dragon", "Gladiators of Athas"( also loosely based on the Darksun series from AD&D 2nd Edition), "Vampires" (currently closed), "Calian Warriors", "The Free Mercenaries of Sparkle", the "Spirit Circle of Psuchae", and the "Army of Darkness").

Layman guilds
Most of the layman guilds available in the game are original, including the "Ancient Order of the Dragon", "Cadets of Gelan", "Tricksters", "Elemental Worshippers of Calia", "Gardeners of Gont", "August Order of Minstrels", "Blademasters of Khalakhor" and the "Necromancers of Vile Darkness". While some are based in literature environments (like the "Shieldbearers of Iron Delving", "Cabal Thieves of Hiddukel", "Thornlin Militia", "Heralds of the Valar", "Ansalon Elvish Archers" (which, together with the Thornlin Militia, can also be considered an occupational guild), "Minotaurs of the Bloodsea", "Pirates of the Bloodsea" and the "Templar Knights of Takhisis"), they are not directly based on existing guilds in Tolkien's Lord of the Rings or Weis and Hickman's Dragonlance.

Craftsman guilds
The newer branch of guilds, craftsman guilds, do not give combat-related skills. The only guilds available in this slot are the Mariners of the High Seas, the Blacksmiths of Bree, and the Gardeners of Gont. Both the Blacksmiths of Bree and the Gardeners of Gont were formerly layman-only guilds, but have been converted so that they can used in either the layman guild slot or the craftsman guild slot. This allows players greater flexibility in customizing their characters, as well as slight advantages gained by the use of their special abilities. Blacksmiths are able to create armor and weapons to be worn and used by players; Gardeners can collect herbs to aid with skills, healing, etc. in their adventures; Mariners will find it easier to travel and to access certain areas on the Donut.

Clubs
Contrary to the guilds, clubs do not have taxes. Characters can join any number of clubs as long as they fill the requirements each has (for example, the "Dancers of the Veil", the "Nisse Ohtar" and the "Ladies Club" require the character to be female, the "Mummers of Sybarus" and the "Gentlemen Club" to be male, the "Rich Men Club" to pay a determined amount of money upon joining, the "Prestigious Knights Club" to be good aligned, the "Wise People" to be over 100 days old, the "Equestrians of Bree" to rent a horse, the "Ancients" to have belonged to the Mystics, an old and already removed guild from the game, the "Beggars" to be a relatively inexperienced character, the "Shields of Minas Morgul" to be evil aligned and support the Minas Morgul cause, and the "Old Fogeys" to be hobbit, dwarf or human). Some clubs have free entrance, like the "Storytellers".

Clubs increase the amount of "emotes" and actions the character can display.

Players and characters
Genesis has several hundred players, increasing at an average of 3 players per day. During most part of the day, at least a dozen are logged in. The majority of the players are from United States, Sweden and Poland, although there are players from other 25 countries in lesser amounts.

According to the rules, a player can have several characters, but use only one at a time. Breaking this rule (known as double login) is considered cheating, with punishment ranging from warnings to character deletion.

There are two kind of players: those controlling mortal characters (usually referred as mortal players or just mortals) and those controlling immortal characters (usually known as immortals or wizards).

Mortals
The majority of the population is made of players controlling mortal characters (or simply mortal players), the real players of the game. Mortal players can join different guilds, use items, quest, travel, execute different actions, fight each other and become leaders of their guild, and many other things.

Mortal players get their denomination by the fact that their characters can die if their health goes below 1 point.

Character development

Characters can be developed in several ways, including growth in size, alignment, and role-playing.

Character class

The concept of character class does not exist in Genesis. The system of play for the Genesis Mud is a classless system, where an individual character may change and grow as he or she sees fit. This allows for a character to be a member of multiple guilds throughout its lifetime, allowing for freedom of movement and a more robust role-playing potential.

Character level

Similarly, numerical levels do not exist within the Genesis system. To measure absolute character size, Genesis uses its own scale, based on total experience. As the character gains experience, new mortal titles are achieved.  Because of the unique Genesis skill system, in many cases a difference of size is not enough to ensure a victory. Although originally nine, in 2001 they were increased to sixteen levels, from utter novice to myth, the smallest and highest titles, respectively.

The ranking of mortal level progresses as follows:

(Utter) Novice < Greenhorne < Beginner < Apprentice < Wanderer < Adventurer < Adept < Great Adventurer < Veteran < Expert < Rising Hero < Hero < Titan < Champion < Legend < Myth

Experience progress during a game session can be tracked using a special command. Although it is not possible to see how many experience points have been earned, the player is still able to follow the character's growth by eleven progress labels, depending on the number of experience points compared with the initial amount of experience the character had at the beginning of such session. Experience can be gained from battles, quests, and general things such as forging items and picking herbs.

Character alignment

Alignment is another transient property of character development, as unlike some variations of the MUD phenomenon, characters are not restricted to a single alignment path. Alignment changes through quests completed and monsters slain, and may rise or fall depending on the character's current leanings. There are 23 alignment levels, with one true "neutral" level.

Evil character alignment progresses from Neutral to Damned along the following path:

Neutral | Disagreeable | Untrustworthy | Unsympathetic | Sinister | Wicked | Nasty | Foul | Evil | Malevolent | Beastly | Demonic | Damned

Good character alignment progresses from Neutral to Holy along the following path:

Neutral | Agreeable | Trustworthy | Sympathetic | Nice | Sweet | Good | Devout | Blessed | Saintly | Holy

Character role-play

Character development may also take the form of role-play. Through role-play, characters may establish themselves as unique individuals among the population of the Donut. This takes several forms, from ideologies, to mannerisms, speech, and play style. Role-play may be aided through the use of clubs and emotes, which allow the character to more fully develop his or her persona.

Immortals
The players with immortal characters (usually known as simply immortal players or wizards) are the administrators of the MUD. The wizards take care of the game itself, keeping it running, upgrading computer hardware, creating new items and areas, fixing bugs and keeping track of the behaviour of the mortal players.

Though immortal players cannot play the game with their immortal character, they can do so with a mortal character.

To become an immortal, the player must apply for wizardhood after having experienced the game for some time and read the different help files. If the player has many characters, the most active character would be allowed for wizardhood. As a wizard, he will have to choose a domain in which to serve, and once his application is accepted by the Liege of the domain, he will be allowed to code for it.

Immortal players are specifically divided into different groups: apprentices (players who are currently not linked to any domain available), wizards (the majority of immortals assigned to domains), archwizards (head of a group of wizards with a determined task, like the Arch of Players in charge of verifying abuse of rules and solve conflicts between mortal players, the Arch of Events in charge of creating special events for the players to participate in, and the Arch of Balance, in charge of keeping the balance between the players and the MUD, and between the guilds themselves), lieges (wizards in charge of a domain), stewards (liege'''s assistants), keepers (wizards who maintain the physical hardware, update the operating system where the MUD is running, the gamedriver and the mudlib), mages (retired or not active wizards) and pilgrims'' (invited people).

Races
Six races are available at the beginning: humans, elves, dwarves, hobbits, gnomes, and goblins.  It is possible for players to change the race of their character after the character has died. It is also possible to adopt a sub-race during the game.

Sub-races
Sub-races are variations from the main races, available only to certain races and in certain situations. To achieve a sub-race, a determined race is needed. There are 5 readily available sub-races: half-elves, kenders, minotaurs, hobgoblins and orcs.  The Nazgûl sub-race is reserved to the leaders of the "Society of Morgul Mages". Also, the ogre sub-race is reserved for soldiers of the Army of Darkness.

References

External links
 Official web site
 Official forums

1989 video games
Fantasy video games
MUD games
Video games developed in Sweden